Vodka is a distilled alcoholic beverage.

Vodka may also refer to:
VoDKa, a cyber alias of Columbine school shooter Dylan Klebold
Vodka (horse), a Japanese racehorse
Vodka (Case Closed), a character in Case Closed
"Vodka" (song), a 2008 song by Morena
"Vodka", a song by Korpiklaani from their 2009 album Karkelo
Vodkaa, komisario Palmu, a 1969 film by Matti Kassila